Lynn Starling (September 13, 1888 – February 25, 1955) was an American screenwriter and playwright. Starling wrote the 1923 play Meet the Wife, subsequently adapted into a 1931 film of the same title.

Selected filmography
The Time, the Place and the Girl (1946)
Three Little Girls in Blue (1946)
It's a Pleasure (1945)
The Impostor (1944)
Footlight Serenade (1942)
Moon Over Miami (1941)
He Married His Wife (1940)
Three Blind Mice (1938)
Women of Glamour (1937)
More Than a Secretary (1936)
Give Us This Night (1936)
Shanghai (1935)
Down to Their Last Yacht (1934)
Love Time (1934)
Cynara (1932)
Back Street (1932)
Transatlantic (1931)
Always Goodbye (1931)
Don't Bet on Women (1931)
Dumbbells in Ermine (1930)
Oh, for a Man! (1930)

References

Bibliography
 Solomon, Aubrey. The Fox Film Corporation, 1915-1935: A History and Filmography. McFarland, 2011.

External links

1888 births
1955 deaths
People from Hopkinsville, Kentucky
Kentucky women writers
Screenwriters from Kentucky
20th-century American screenwriters
20th-century American women writers